Fuente, Spanish for "fountain" or "spring", may refer to:

People
 Claire dela Fuente (1958–2021), Filipino singer
 José Manuel Fuente (1945–1996), Spanish road racing cyclist
 Justin Fuente (born 1976),  college football coach in U.S.
 Luis La Fuente (born 1947), Peruvian football defender

Places
 Fuente-Álamo, Spain
 Fuente Álamo de Murcia, Spain
 Fuente Carreteros, Córdoba, Spain
 Fuente de Cantos, Badajoz, Spain
 Fuente de Oro, Colombia
 Fuente de Pedro Naharro, Cuenca, Spain
 Fuente de Piedra, Málaga, Spain
 Fuente de Piedra Lagoon, a wetland in Málaga, Spain
 Fuente de Santa Cruz, Segovia, Spain
 Fuente del Arco, Badajoz, Spain
 Fuente del Maestre, Badajoz, Spain
 Fuente el Fresno, Ciudad Real, Spain
 Fuente el Olmo de Fuentidueña, Segovia, Spain
 Fuente el Olmo de Íscar, Segovia, Spain
 Fuente el Saúz, Ávila, Spain
 Fuente el Saz de Jarama, Spain
 Fuente el Sol, Valladolid, Spain
 Fuente Encalada, Zamora, Spain
 Fuente la Lancha, Córdoba, Spain
 Fuente la Reina, Castellón, Spain
 Fuente Obejuna, Córdoba, Spain
 Fuente-Olmedo, Valladolid, Spain
 Fuente Palmera, Spain
 Fuente-Tójar, Spain
 Fuente Vaqueros, Spain
 La Fuente de San Esteban, Salamanca, Spain

See also
 
 de la Fuente
 Lafuente (disambiguation)
 Fuentes (disambiguation)